Eole (1878–1888) was an American Thoroughbred Champion racehorse who was one of the last of the great long distance runners.

Eole was bred by at Ellerslie Stud in Albemarle County, Virginia by owner Richard J. Hancock, the father of Arthur B. Hancock who later founded Claiborne Farm in Kentucky. Unraced at age two, Eole was then purchased by Frederick Gebhard and raced at age three.

Conditioned for racing by Evert Snedecker, in 1881 Eole's best major race results were second-place finishes in the  Dixie Stakes, Gravesend Handicap and in the Classic, Belmont Stakes. At age four, Eole was one of the top long distance runners in the United States, winning the Champion Stakes and the Great Metropolitan Stakes  at 1½ miles, the Jockey Club Handicap  at 2 miles, the Monmouth Cup at 2¼ miles, and the Autumn Cup at 3 miles at Sheepshead Bay Race Track.

1883 Championship year
At age five, Eole's wins included the first of his two consecutive victories in the 1½ mile Freehold Stakes at the Monmouth Park Association's Long Branch Racetrack and his second straight win of the 3 mile Autumn Cup.  Eole's performances that year earned him retrospective American Champion Older Male Horse honors from Thoroughbred Heritage. 

At age six in 1884, Eole won his second edition of the Freehold Stakes and in 1885 was sent to race in England where he ran second in the prestigious 2½ mile Ascot Gold Cup to Epsom Derby winner, St. Gatien. For 1886, Eole returned home to the United States where he raced through age nine, notably winning the 1887 Kearney Stakes at Saratoga Race Course.

Retired to stud duty for the 1888 season, on August 13 Eole was being shipped aboard an Erie Railroad express train from New York City bound for Chicago when it derailed at Shohola, Pennsylvania at 1:40 in the morning. The railcar filled with horses rolled down an 80 foot embankment and burst into flames. One person died in the fire along with Eole and fourteen other horses belonging to Frederick Gebhard and his companion, the actress Lillie Langtry. . One of the horses to survive the disaster was St Saviour, full brother to Eole.

Notes

References

Sources
Eole's pedigree and partial racing stats
August 14, 1888 New York Times article on Eole's breeding and racing history
August 14, 1888 New York Times article on the train crash death of Eole

1878 racehorse births
1888 racehorse deaths
Racehorses bred in Virginia
Racehorses trained in the United States
Thoroughbred family 37
American Champion racehorses